The Jardin botanique de Sedan is a botanical garden and city park located on Philippoteaux Avenue beside the Place d'Alsace-Lorraine, Sedan, Ardennes, Champagne-Ardenne, France. It is open daily without charge.

The garden was established in 1875 upon the demolition of the Bourbon bastion, with its plan drawn up by René Richer. A statue of Paul et Virginie beneath an umbrella, battered in the cyclone of 1905, still graces the garden. Today it contains mature trees (beech, maple, chestnut), magnolias, a rose garden with more than 50 varieties, a collection of hydrangeas, a bandstand, and a pool with fish, swans, and ducks.

See also
 List of botanical gardens in France

References
 Je Decouvre La France article (French)
 Culture.fr entry (French)
 Jardinez entry (French)
 Nomao entry (French)
 D. Blondin et al., "Inventaire des arbres et arbustes: Jardin botanique de Sedan", Bulletin de la Société d'histoire naturelle des Ardennes, 2001, vol. 91, pp. 81–88. ISSN 0373-8442.  

Gardens in Ardennes (department)
Botanical gardens in France
Sedan, Ardennes